Marquette may refer to:

Locations

France
Marquette-en-Ostrevant, Nord
Marquette-lez-Lille, Nord

United States
Marquette, Iowa
Marquette, Kansas
Marquette, Nebraska
Marquette (town), Wisconsin
Marquette, Wisconsin, village within the town
Marquette County, Michigan
Marquette, Michigan, a city within the county
Roman Catholic Diocese of Marquette
Marquette Township, Marquette County, Michigan, a township within the country
Marquette County, Wisconsin
Marquette Heights, Illinois
Marquette Interchange, in downtown Milwaukee, Wisconsin
Marquette Island, in Lake Huron
Marquette Mountain, a winter sports area in Marquette, Michigan
Marquette Park, Chicago, Illinois
Marquette Park (Gary), Indiana
Marquette Park (Mackinac Island), Michigan
Marquette Township, Mackinac County, Michigan
Lake Marquette, a lake in Minnesota

Canada
Marquette, Manitoba
Marquette (provincial electoral district), a current provincial electoral district, or riding, in Quebec
Marquette (electoral district), a Canadian electoral district in Manitoba from 1871 to 1976
Marquette Lake, head water body of the Marquette River in Quebec
Marquette River, a tributary of Ashuapmushuan Lake in Quebec
Marquette River West, a tributary of the Marquette River in Quebec

Education
Marquette University, a Jesuit University in Milwaukee, Wisconsin
 Marquette Golden Eagles, this school's athletic program
Marquette High School (disambiguation), several

People
Chris Marquette, an American actor
Jacques Marquette, a French explorer
Ron Marquette, an American actor
Sean Marquette, an American actor
Turner M. Marquette, an American politician

Transportation
Marquette (automobile)
Buick Marquette
Marquette (Amtrak), a Chicago–Milwaukee train once operated by Amtrak
Marquette Transportation Company

Ships
USS Marquette (AKA-95), a World War II US ship  launched in 1945
USS Neshanic (AO-71), a World War II US ship built as the SS Marquette, launched in 1942
SS Marquette (1881), a Lake Superior shipwreck off the coast of Wisconsin, United States
SS Marquette (1897), a British World War I transport ship torpedoed in the Aegean in 1915
 Marquette (HBC vessel), operated by the Hudson's Bay Company from 1879 to 1883; see Hudson's Bay Company vessels

Other uses
Marquette (grape), a hybrid grape variety

See also
Pere Marquette (disambiguation)
Marquette Building (disambiguation)
Marquette Nat. Bank of Minneapolis v. First of Omaha Service Corp.
The Marketts
Mar-Keys